Morris Brenner (August 25, 1914 – August 25, 2005) was an American actor. He was best known for playing Pvt. Irving Fleischman in The Phil Silvers Show.

Life and career 
Brenner was born in Chicago, Illinois. He began his career in 1948, appearing in the Broadway play The Bees and the Flowers.

Brenner appeared and starred in other Broadway plays, his theatre credits including The Madwoman of Chaillot, Two's Company Sing Till Tomorrow, Lunatics and Lovers, Julia, Jake and Uncle Joe, The Beauty Part, also assistant stage-managing, Once for the Asking,  Fiddler on the Roof and Minor Miracle.

From 1950 to 1993, Brenner appeared in various television programs. He was hired to play Duane Doberman on the sitcom The Phil Silvers Show, but was recast in the role of Irving Fleischman when Maurice Gosfield came and auditioned for the role of Doberman. Other television credits include Naked City, Car 54, Where Are You?, East Side/West Side, The Dick Van Dyke Show,
and Tribeca. Brenner's film credits include Lilith, Mirage, The Purple Rose of Cairo, Sweet Lorraine and American Stories: Food, Family and Philosophy.

Brenner retired in 1993, last appearing in the anthology drama television series Tribeca.

Death 
Brenner died in August 2005 at the Actors Fund Home in Englewood, New Jersey, on his 91st birthday.

Filmography

Film

Television

References

External links 

Rotten Tomatoes profile

1914 births
2005 deaths
People from Chicago
Male actors from Chicago
American male television actors
American male stage actors
20th-century American male actors